Michael Hess may refer to:

Michael A. Hess (1952–1995), lawyer and chief legal counsel to the Republican National Committee
Michael L. Hess, professor of medicine
Michael Hess (fugitive) (born 1950), long-time fugitive and inmate, Tampa, Florida (caught 2007)
Michael Hess (rower) (born 1955), American Olympic rower